Adrienne Marie Lambert (née Parker; born ) is a former international lawn bowler from New Zealand.

Bowls career
Lambert won a gold and silver medals at the 1989 Asia Pacific Bowls Championships, in Suva, Fiji. She went on to win three more medals at further Championships.

The following year she won a silver medal in the women's fours with Lyn McLean, Marlene Castle and Rhoda Ryan at the 1990 Commonwealth Games in Auckland.

Four years later she won a bronze medal in the women's fours with Ann Muir, Colleen Ferrick and Marlene Castle at the 1994 Commonwealth Games in Victoria, British Columbia.

In between the Games, Lambert won double silver in the triples and fours at the 1992 World Outdoor Bowls Championship in Ayr.

In addition Lambert has won the 1988 pairs title and the 1981, 1989, 1990 and 1991 fours title at the New Zealand National Bowls Championships when bowling for the Matamata Bowls Club.

She was the manager of the New Zealand women's team from 1996 until 2000.

References

1930s births
Living people
New Zealand female bowls players
Commonwealth Games silver medallists for New Zealand
Commonwealth Games bronze medallists for New Zealand
Commonwealth Games medallists in lawn bowls
Bowls players at the 1990 Commonwealth Games
Bowls players at the 1994 Commonwealth Games
Medallists at the 1990 Commonwealth Games
Medallists at the 1994 Commonwealth Games